The Kemp & Hebert Building, also known as the Liberty Furniture Store, is a historic four-story building in Spokane, Washington. It was designed by Alfred Jones in the Classical Revival style, and built in 1908 as a store for Kemp & Hebert, a dry goods company co-founded by Spokane businessmen  Charles J. Kemp and Henry H. Hebert in 1892. It has been listed on the National Register of Historic Places since July 1, 1994.

References

National Register of Historic Places in Spokane County, Washington
Neoclassical architecture in Washington (state)
Chicago school architecture in Washington (state)
Commercial buildings completed in 1908